Meetings, incentives, conferences and exhibitions tourism (MICE tourism) is a type of tourism in which large groups, usually planned well in advance, are brought together. Recently there has been an industry trend toward using the term "meetings industry" to avoid confusion from the acronym. Other industry educators are recommending the use of "events industry" to be an umbrella term for the vast scope of the meeting and events and profession.

Most components of MICE are well understood from their names, perhaps with the exception of incentives. Incentive tourism is usually undertaken as a type of employee reward by a company or institution for targets met or exceeded, or a job well done. Unlike the other types of MICE tourism, incentive tourism is usually conducted purely for entertainment, rather than professional or education purposes. MICE events are usually centered on a theme or topic and are aimed at a professional, school, academic or trade organization or other special interest group.

Convention bureaus 
MICE event locations are normally bid on by specialized convention bureaus in particular countries and cities and established for the purpose of bidding on MICE activities. This process of marketing and bidding is normally conducted well in advance of the event, often several years, as securing major events can benefit the local economy of the host city or country. Convention bureaus may offer financial subsidies to attract MICE events to their city.  Today it is usually used to boost hotel revenue.

MICE tourism is known for its extensive planning and demanding clientele.

References

Meetings

Hospitality management